Holmdahl is a Swedish surname. Notable people with the surname include:

Emil Lewis Holmdahl (1883–1963), United States Army officer
John W. Holmdahl (1924–2017), American politician
Martin H:son Holmdahl (1923-2015), Swedish physician

Swedish-language surnames